The  is a river in Niigata Prefecture in Japan. It flows into the Shinano River,  which is the longest in Japan. It is suited for sport fishing and maybe rafting but not for swimming.

External links
 (confluence with Shinano River)

Rivers of Niigata Prefecture
Rivers of Japan